Corry may refer to:

Places
Corry, County Westmeath, a townland in Rathaspick civil parish, barony of Moygoish, County Westmeath, Ireland
Lough Corry, a lake in Ireland
Corry, Highland, the location of a pier in Broadford, Scotland
Corry, Missouri, United States, an unincorporated community
Corry, Pennsylvania, United States, a city
Corry Island, Antarctica
Corry Massif, Antarctica
Corry Rocks, Antarctica

People
Corry (surname)
Corrie (given name), including people named Corry

Other uses
, three US Navy ships
Corry baronets, a title in the Baronetage of the United Kingdom

See also
Cory (disambiguation)
Corey (disambiguation)
Corrie (disambiguation)
Curry (disambiguation)